Zelda is a nickname for the feminine name Griselda, which may originally have meant "dark battle" or "strong woman;" often combined to mean "Grey fighting maiden". It is also the feminine form of the Yiddish name Selig, meaning "blessed", "happy".

Since 1986, the name has been associated with the popular Nintendo franchise The Legend of Zelda and its eponymous character Princess Zelda.

People
 Zelda Barron (1929–2006), British director, screenwriter, and producer
 Zelda Curtis (1923–2012), British journalist
 Zelda D'Aprano (1928–2018), Australian feminist activist
 Zelda F. Gamson (born 1936), American sociologist, writer, and activist
 Zelda Fichandler (1924–2016), American stage producer, director, and educator
 Zelda Fitzgerald (1900–1948), American writer, painter, and socialite; wife of F. Scott Fitzgerald
 Zelda Harris (born 1985), American actress
 Zelda Jongbloed (1950–2018), South African journalist and politician
 Zelda Kahan (1886–1969), British communist
 Zelda Kaplan (1917–2012), American socialite
 Zelda La Grange (born 1970), South African former private secretary to President Nelson Mandela
 Zelda Lockhart, American writer, speaker, teacher, and researcher
 Zelda McCague (1888–2001), Canadian supercentenarian
 Zelda Nolte, British sculptor
 Zelda Nordlinger (1932–2008), American feminist and women’s rights activist coordinator
 Zelda Popkin (1898–1983), American mystery novelist
 Zelda Rubinstein (1933–2010), American actress
 Zelda Schneersohn Mishkovsky (1914–1984), (pen-name “Zelda”), Israeli poet, notable writer of Hebrew religious poetry
 Zelda Sears (1873–1935), American entertainer
 Zelda Seguin Wallace (1848–1914), American opera singer and suffragist
 Zelda the Brain, a female professional wrestler from the Gorgeous Ladies of Wrestling
 Zelda Tinska (born 1978), Serbian actress
 Zelda Williams (born 1989), American actress, director, producer, and writer; daughter of Robin Williams
 Zelda Wynn Valdes (1905–2001), American fashion designer and costumer
 Zelda Zabinsky, American industrial engineer and operations researcher
 Sean N. Zelda, musician who founded the band We Came as Romans
 Zelda Zonk, a pseudonym used by Marilyn Monroe (1926–1962)

See also
 Zelda (disambiguation) for a list that includes fictional characters

References

English feminine given names